Giennadij Jerszow is a Polish–Ukrainian sculptor, jewelry designer and art teacher. He is a member of the National Union of Artists of Ukraine, and the National Association of Polish Artists and Designers. He is known for the production of monumental works, easel compositions and portraits, represented in different countries.

Biography
Jerszow was born on 12 July 1967 in Chernihiv, in Northern Ukraine in a mixed Polish–Ukrainian family. As a repatriate he acquired Polish citizenship and his family moved in 2001 to Poland, where he currently resides in the city of Gdańsk.
Being brought up in a multinational family, he is fluent in Russian, Ukrainian and Polish, and gained a love for the history and culture of different nationalities.
During his school years (1974–1982), he was engaged in gymnastics and judo.  He graduated from a music school in the class of bass guitar, and began to show interest in photography. Following the family tradition, he planned to become a doctor. In 1986 he graduated from medical college, received a medical education (bachelor degree) in the specialty of paramedic; he then worked for two years in medical institutions. During his training, he became interested in wood carving and jewelry, took part in regional exhibitions. At the all-Union competition-exhibition of the folk art of the USSR held in Livadia in 1985 he was awarded with the "Small Medal of the Laureate". 
While working in medicine, he expanded the boundaries of knowledge of human psychology; as a result, he decided to change the direction and devote himself to art. He took up drawing and sculpture, moved to Kiev in 1986 to attend the studio of fine arts of George Khusid, where he took up portraits and prepared for entrance exams at the art university.

Education
From 1988 to 1991, Jerszow studied at the Lviv Academy of Arts at the department of monumental sculpture in the group of Emanuel Mysko. At the same time, he began to study privately and work in the workshop of Anatoly Galyan, where he gained practical experience in creating monumental works at all stages of realization. He subsequently he trained at the Ukrainian Academy of Arts faculty of sculpture and worked in a workshop of Valery Shvetsov and academician Vasyl Borodai. In 1995, he defended his diploma on historical and religious topics relating to Ancient Russia – "Monument to Holy Prince Mikhail and Boyar Fedor".

Teaching 
1996 – 1999 assistant and seniority at (NAVAA) National Academy of Visual Arts and Architecture, his supervisor was an Academician Vasyl Borodai. He began cooperation with a historian Vladimir Kovalenko and an academician Petro Tolochko, at the same time published articles in scientific journals. He created a program to perpetuate historical figures and events of the 17–18 centuries (based on historical materials of the Northern Part of the Left Bank of Ukraine). He created a series of projects dedicated to national heroes. The image of Ivan Mazepa was later embodied in bronze and was the first monument in Ukraine dedicated to the hetman – philanthropist.
1999 – 2000 Senior Lecturer at the Faculty of Fine Arts. National University "Chernihiv Collegium" named after T. G. Shevchenko. Chernihiv, Ukraine.
2003 – 2004 Teacher of sculpture and metal plastics. Composition of connected plastic schools.  Gdynia – Orlovo, Poland.

Creative method
The sculptor works in a realistic style. The elaborate details are combined with lively textured sculpting and graceful lines, which makes the composition easy and dynamic.
The artist carefully selects themes for his works. Throughout his creative career, he has been creating portraits and figurines of artists and scientists, religious figures and politicians, creating images of famous people from the world of ballet, music and fashion. Thanks to direct contact with contemporaries, he conveys the unique spirit and energy of his heroes. The gallery of a modern portrait is presented by President of Poland Lech Walesa, Pope John Paul II, Patriarch of Ukraine Filaret, Protestant pastor Roman Jan Pawlas, Georgian Director Guram Petriashvili, English singer-songwriter and composer Ken Hensley (Uriah Heep), Polish scholar Andrzej Ceynowa, artists: Evhen Karas, Vlad Dimyon, Yuri Olishkevych (USA), female images “Olga”, “Barbara”, “Anastasia”, as well as the artist's children “Wanda” and “Ostap”.
The sculptor's works are distinguished by sensuality and emotionality, in each piece of work he conveys the individuality, mood and inner world of a person.
As a material he uses bronze, ceramics, silver.
He owns workshops in Gdańsk (Poland) and Chernihiv (Ukraine). He is the founder of the private gallery "FART", which has been engaged in the production and sale of sculptural works since 1995.
 
Categories
 Monumental sculpture (monuments, memorials, busts, statues)
 Easel sculpture (portrait, figurative sculpture, composition)
 Sculpture of small forms (Figurines)
 Reliefs
 Jewelry work

Genres
 Portrait (in the collection are portraits of artists and scientists, religious figures and politicians, historical heroes and contemporaries)
 Sacred art (statues, reliefs, jewelry in silver)
 Historical genre (the artist created a number of monumental works dedicated to historical events and characters)
 Figurative art

Solo exhibitions
 1994 – Borisoglebsky Cathedral Chernihiv.
 1996 – DK, Slavutich.
 1997 – Central House of Artists, Kyiv.
 1998 – "A Look into the History". Museum of History and Fine Arts, (Muzeul de Istorie şi Artă al Municipiului Bucureşti) Bucharest.
 1998 – Ukrainian House, Kyiv.
 1998 – The National Bank of Ukraine, Kyiv.
 1998 – National Palace of Ukraine, Kyiv.
 2004 – Gallery of the Art College, Gdynia.
 2004 – Historical Museum of Gdańsk (Old Town Hall), Gdańsk.
 2005 – Baltic Sea Culture Center, Gdańsk.
 2005 – Diocesan Museum, Pelplin.
 2014 – Borisoglebsky Cathedral, Chernihiv.
 2017 – Gallery of the Union of Artists, Gdańsk.

Famous works
 1996 – memorial to the victims of the Chernobyl disaster (bronze, granite).  Chernihiv, Ukraine;
 1997 – - to the 900th anniversary of the First Congress of Princes of Kievan Rus (bronze, granite).  Liubech, Ukraine;
 1998 –  (marble, granite), Herastrau Park, Bucharest, Romania;
 2002 – "The Archangel Raphael and Tobias", figurative bas-relief, hospice.  Gdańsk, Poland;
 2002 – "The Apostle Jude Thaddaeus" figure, hospice.  Gdańsk, Poland;
 2003 – memorial plaque – portrait of Pallottine priest Eugeniusz Dutkiewicz (bronze), hospice.  Gdańsk, Poland;
 2004 – a plaque – a portrait of Julian Rummel, one of the founders of Gdynia – on the facade of the headquarters of the Polish Navy (bronze). Gdynia, Poland;
 2005 – Figurines "Orpheus", for laureates of the  named after Woytek Lowski;
 2005 –  depicting a famous dancer in the role of "Hamlet" Poland;
 2005 – a plaque – a portrait of Janina Jarzynowna-Sobczak, founder of the ballet school in Gdańsk (bronze). Gdańsk, Poland;
 2006 – monument to Taras Shevchenko (bronze, granite), on the territory of ChSPU named after T. G. Shevchenko. Chernihiv, Ukraine;
 2005–2006 – "The way of the Cross" – 15 relief images (bronze) – Basilica of the Assumption of the Virgin Mary. Gdańsk, Poland;
 2008 – monument to Peter Prokopovich, (bronze, granite). Palchyky, Chernihiv region;
 2007–2008 — "Stations of the Cross" — 14 reliefs (bronze) — Church of St. Anthony. Torun, Poland;
 2007 "Stanislaw Moniuszko" portrait – bust of the composer (bronze). The Stanislaw Moniuszko Academy of Music in Gdańsk, Poland;
 2008 "Frederic Chopin" portrait – bust of the composer (bronze). Polish Baltic F.Chopin Philharmonic in Gdańsk, Poland;
 2009 –  (bronze, granite). The University of Gdańsk. Gdańsk, Poland;
 2009 – (bronze, marble). Chernihiv, Ukraine;
 2009 –  (bronze, granite). Warsaw, Poland;
 2009 – , alias Zapora" (bronze, granite). Tarnobrzeg, Poland;
 2009 – the fountain "Roses", Central Square. Tarnobrzeg, Poland;
 2010 – memorial on the site of the papal altar, in honour of the Holy mass with the participation of John Paul II at Zaspa in Gdańsk on 12 June 1987. Gdańsk, Poland;
 2010 – "Stations of the Cross" – 14 reliefs (bronze,wood). Parish of the Exaltation of the Holy Cross in Gdańsk;
 2011 – figures – "Vaslav Nijinsky and Bronislava Nijinska" (bronze).The Great Theatre – National Opera. Warsaw, Poland;
 2012 – monument to the Chaplain of "Solidarity" Henryk Jankowski. Gdańsk, Poland;
 2014 – monument to Pope John Paul II. "Radio MARIA". Torun, Poland;
 2014 – memorial plaque – portrait of the composer Feliks Nowowiejski, music school patron (bronze). Gdańsk, Poland;
 2014 – figure "Ken Hensley" (Uriah Heep) English singer – songwriter and composer (bronze, marble). Alicante, Spain;
 2014 – figure "Arthur Schopenhauer" monument path implementation;
 2014 – "Stations of the Cross" – 14 reliefs (bronze). Askold's Grave. Kyiv, Ukraine;
Gdańsk, Poland;
Gdańsk, Poland;
 2017 – The Sarcophagus of Bishops of Pelpin. Bronze relief shutters depict angels and heraldry. Cathedral Basilica of the Assumption. Pelplin, Poland;
 2018 -2020 – series of portrait statues dedicated to the prominent people of art.

Customers
Opening of the monuments took place with the participation of
 Presidents of Ukraine Leonid Kuchma and Viktor Yushchenko, President of Poland Lech Kaczynski,
 Vice - Prime Minister of Ukraine Valeriy Smoliy,
 Ministers of culture of Poland Waldemar Dąbrowski and Romania Ion Karatu,
 Marshal of the Polish Senate Bogdan Borusewicz,
 Archbishops Tadeusz Gocłowski, Sławoj Leszek Głódź, bishop Andrzej Suski, Ryszard Kasyna, Włodzimierz Juszczak,
 Presidents of cities Wojciech Szczurek, Paweł Adamowicz, Jan Dziubinski, mayor of Bucharest Viorel Lis.

Among the customers were state and public institutions
City Council of Chernihiv; City Council of Gdańsk;  City Council of Tarnobrzeg.
Embassy of Ukraine in Bucharest and in Warsaw.
Headquarters of the Navy of Poland – Gdynia.
Basilica of the Assumption of the Virgin Mary – Gdańsk;
Basilica of St. Brigida – Gdańsk;
"Radio Maria" Torun.
Archdiocese of Gdańsk, Diocese of Pelplin, Diocese of Torun.
University of Gdańsk;
Chernihiv National University. after T.G. Shevchenko;
Historical reserve "Ancient Val" – Chernihiv;
Historical reserve "Ancient Liubech".
Polish Baltic Philharmonic named after Frederic Chopin;
Stanislav Monyushko Academy of Music in Gdańsk;
Ballet School – Gdańsk;
The Great Theatre – National Opera in Warsaw.
Also private companies and corporations.
Works are located in museums and private collections ..

Awards and honors
 Church awards: Medal "PRO OPERE POLITISSIMA ARTE PERFECTO" by Primate of Poland Cardinal Jozef Glemp
 Public Awards: Badge of Honor “Golden Jewel of the Mazepa Family”

Personal life
He is the father of three children: Philip born in 1989, Wanda born in 1995, Eustathius (Ostap) born in 1998.

Gallery

References

Sources
 В. П. Коваленко.  Єршов Геннадій Олексійович Encyclopedia of modern Ukraine (On Ukrainian)
 Єршов Геннадій Олексійович Сайт Національної спілки художників України National Union of Artists of Ukraine
 Ольга Собкович  Українсько-польський скульптор – Геннадій Єршов // Образотворче мистецтво No.  4,  — 2010, No.  1,  — 2011 Fine Arts (magazine)(On Ukrainian)
 Marek Adamkowicz Gennadij Jerszow i jego rzeźby "rozsiane" po całym Pomorzu // Dziennik Bałtycki 9 lutego  — 2014

External links
 http://www.jerszow.ecom.net.pl/
 В. П. Коваленко.  Єршов Геннадій Олексійович Encyclopedia of modern Ukraine (On Ukrainian)
 Gennadij Jerszow i jego rzeźby "rozsiane" po całym Pomorzu
 В Украине появился первый памятник Мазепе
 В Чернигове открыли памятник Мазепе
 Чернігові відбулося відкриття пам’ятника гетьману України Івану Мазепі. Фоторепортаж
 Ющенко взяв участь у відкритті пам'ятного знаку жертвам Голодомору 1932–1933 рр у Варшаві
 У Гданьску відкрили пам'ятник святому Володимиру роботи скульптора Єршова
 У Польщі з'явився пам'ятник київському князю Володимиру
 У Ґданську відкрили пам'ятник князю Володимиру
 Володимир Великий у Ґданську
 Пам’ятник живій легенді – Кен Хенслі у бронзі
 Скульптор Єршов: між Черніговом і Гданськом 
 ГЕННАДІЙ ЄРШОВ: "СКУЛЬПТУРА ВІДНОВЛЮЄ ІСТОРІЮ ТА ДОПОМАГАЄ СУЧАСНИКАМ ПАМ'ЯТАТИ"

1967 births
20th-century male artists
20th-century Polish sculptors
20th-century Ukrainian sculptors
21st-century male artists
21st-century Polish sculptors
Living people
National Academy of Visual Arts and Architecture alumni
Polish contemporary artists
People from Chernihiv
People from Gdańsk
Polish male sculptors
Polish portrait artists
Ukrainian emigrants to Poland
Ukrainian male sculptors
Ukrainian people of Polish descent